Hans-Åke Nordström (1933-2022) was a Swedish archaeologist and professor at Uppsala University. His work has included excavations in parts of Nubia, submerged since the construction of the Aswan Dam, and the development of the Vienna System for classifying Egyptian pottery.

Career

Hans-Åke Nordström was born 1933. During the 1960s he excavated parts of Nubia, an area between Aswan in Egypt and Khartoum in Sudan, which were submerged following the construction of the Aswan Dam.

In 1972 he received his Ph.D., on the basis of his thesis Ceramic Ecology and Ceramic Technology. Early Nubian Cultures from the Fifth and Fourth Millennia B.C.. The work was considered "an important step into the archaeological science", for offering new ways of analysing ceramics and classifying their shapes. It led to his appointment as docent in archaeological science at Uppsala University, where he was the first person to hold such a position.

Nordström also worked at the Statens historiska museum, where he was Director of the Bronze Age Section. He also engaged with the Technology and Conservation Department, and established a small laboratory for the exclusive use of visiting scholars.

In 1993 Nordström was given leave to focus once more on research related to his 1960s Nubian excavations. Several publications resulted, including, in 2014, The West Bank Survey from Faras to Gemai I: Sites of Early Nubian, Middle Nubian and Pharaonic Age.

Publications

References

Bibliography
  
  
  
 
  
  
  
  
  

20th-century archaeologists
21st-century archaeologists
Living people
Swedish archaeologists
1930s births
Academic staff of Uppsala University